Oh, Johnny! is a 1918 American silent Western comedy film directed by Ira M. Lowry and starring Louis Bennison, Alphonse Ethier, Edward Roseman, John Daly Murphy, Frank Goldsmith, and Virginia Lee. The film was released by Goldwyn Pictures on December 22, 1918.

Plot

Cast
 Louis Bennison as Johnny Burke
 Alphonse Ethier as John Bryson
 Edward Roseman as Charlie Romero
 John Daly Murphy as Van Pelt Butler
 Frank Goldsmith as Earl of Barncastle
 Virginia Lee as Adele Butler
 Anita Cortez as Dolores
 Louise Brownell as Mrs. Van Pelt Butler
 Russell Simpson as Adele's Father
 Frank Evans (uncredited)

Preservation
A copy of Oh, Johnny! exists at the Museum of Modern Art.

References

External links
 

1918 films
1910s Western (genre) comedy films
1910s English-language films
American black-and-white films
Goldwyn Pictures films
Silent American Western (genre) comedy films
1910s American films